Ch'ŏngch'ŏn'gang station is a signal halt in Maengha-ri, Pakch'ŏn County, North P'yŏngan Province, North Korea. It is on located on the P'yŏngŭi Line of the Korean State Railway, and is the starting point of the Kubongsan Line. It is situated on the bank of the Ch'ŏngch'ŏn River, from which it gets its name.

References

Railway stations in North Korea
Buildings and structures in North Pyongan Province